Borderline lepromatous leprosy is a skin condition with numerous, symmetrical skin lesions.

See also 
 Leprosy
 Cutaneous conditions

References

External links 

Bacterium-related cutaneous conditions